Sithara Gimhan (born 1 February 1996) is a Sri Lankan cricketer. He made his first-class debut for Tamil Union Cricket and Athletic Club in the 2015–16 Premier League Tournament on 2 January 2016. He made his List A debut for Jaffna District in the 2016–17 Districts One Day Tournament on 15 March 2017.

References

External links
 

1996 births
Living people
Sri Lankan cricketers
Jaffna District cricketers
Tamil Union Cricket and Athletic Club cricketers
Cricketers from Galle